Calmira is an alternate shell available for Windows 3.1x and up that has an appearance resembling Windows 95. A version named Calmira Longhorn is not compatible with Windows Vista, but emulates some of the visual features of that operating system.

The shell is more than a simple cosmetic upgrade, however. Much of the functionality of later 32-bit shells has been incorporated into the Calmira software. The shell has a start menu, a task bar and a desktop that all function like those found in the Explorer Desktop of later 32-bit Windows operating systems.

Development 
The Calmira shell was developed in Borland Delphi 1.0, an Object Pascal based programming environment by Borland.  Because the Windows 3.x environment is virtually extinct as of 2009, additions of new features and addons to Calmira are few and far between.

Source code 
The source code for the Calmira shell is publicly available under GNU GPL license, thus allowing software developers to participate in the project. However, as the Calmira shell was initially developed on the 16-bit Delphi 1.0 programming environment, active contributors are more or less restricted to developing the shell on that platform. An attempt to port parts of Calmira to Windows NT 3.51 has been made, and the project has resulted in NT Shell.

Modified versions
Being open source, some people developed their own version of Calmira, adding other features and customizations. Here is a list of the most used ones:

Calmira LFN: Modified version that supports Long File Names, better icon shading, a 'My Documents' icon, and a dialog to change the wallpaper. The last version (released on December 19, 2006) also has custom window borders that mimic Windows 95 ones.
Calmira XP: Modified version that tries to mimic the Windows XP interface. Version 4.0 Beta also includes modifications from Calmira LFN, but has been released on March 6, 2006, meaning that some bugs fixed in Calmira LFN since then are still there, and that there are no custom window borders.
Calmira Longhorn: It is a modified version of Calmira XP 4.0 that mimics the Windows Longhorn (or Vista) interface. Version 3.5 still had some bugs around dialog buttons (they are shown in French). After an extended time with no new updates (2 years) Calmira Longhorn 3.6 was released. In the new version, new features included a Vista style logon screen, an "X" button in the upper-right corner of windows, and LFN Support. Also, the "Frenchbutton bug" was fixed. On 2008-08-19, Peter Protus, developer of Calmira Longhorn, announced that he stopped both the development of the software as well as support. On 2008-11-12, support and development started again.
Calmira Blackcomb: It is a modified version of Calmira Longhorn intended to mimic Windows 7's user interface, following the announcement of continual development of Calmira Longhorn. It was being developed by Peter Protus. After the publication of Calmira Blackcomb Alpha 2, its development was ceased on 2011-09-10.

Other versions and the original one can be found at Calmira Online.

References

External links
 Calmira Online

Desktop shell replacement